Altomonte is a surname. Notable people with the surname include:

Bartolomeo Altomonte (1694–1783), Austrian painter, son of Martino
Martino Altomonte (1657–1745), Italian painter of Austrian descent